In a legend, Saint Georgea soldier venerated in Christianitydefeats a dragon. The story goes that the dragon originally extorted tribute from villagers. When they ran out of livestock and trinkets for the dragon, they started giving up a human tribute once a year. This was acceptable to the villagers until a princess was chosen as the next offering. The saint thereupon rescues the princess chosen as the next offering. The narrative was first set in Cappadocia in the earliest sources of the 11th and 12th centuries, but transferred to Libya in the 13th-century Golden Legend.

The narrative has pre-Christian origins (Jason and Medea, Perseus and Andromeda, Typhon, etc.),  and is recorded in various saints' lives prior to its attribution to St. George specifically. It was particularly attributed to Saint Theodore Tiro in the 9th and 10th centuries, and was first transferred to Saint George in the 11th century. The oldest known record of Saint George slaying a dragon is found in a Georgian text of the 11th century.

The legend and iconography spread rapidly through the Byzantine cultural sphere in the 12th century. It reached Western Christian tradition still in the 12th century, via the crusades. The knights of the First Crusade believed that St. George, along with his fellow soldier-saints Demetrius, Maurice, Theodore and Mercurius had fought alongside them at Antioch and Jerusalem. The legend was popularised in Western tradition in the 13th century based on its Latin versions in the  Speculum Historiale and the Golden Legend. At first limited to the courtly setting of Chivalric romance, the legend was popularised in the 13th century and became a favourite literary and pictorial subject in the Late Middle Ages and Renaissance, and it has become an integral part of the Christian traditions relating to Saint George in both Eastern and Western tradition.

Origins

Pre-Christian predecessors

The iconography of military saints Theodore, George and Demetrius as horsemen
is a direct continuation of the Roman-era "Thracian horseman" type iconography.
The iconography of the dragon appears to grow out of the serpent entwining the "tree of life" on one hand, and with the draco standard used by late Roman cavalry on the other.
Horsemen spearing serpents and boars are widely represented in Roman-era stelae commemorating cavalry soldiers.
A carving from Krupac, Serbia, depicts Apollo and Asclepius as Thracian horsemen, shown besides the serpent entwined around the tree. Another stele shows the Dioscuri as Thracian horsemen on either side of the serpent-entwined tree, killing a boar with their spears.

The development of the hagiographical narrative of the dragon-fight parallels the development of iconography.
It draws from pre-Christian dragon myths. The Coptic version of the Saint George legend, edited by E. A. Wallis Budge in 1888, and estimated by Budge to be based on a source of the 5th or 6th century, names  "governor Dadianus", the persecutor of Saint George as "the dragon of the abyss". a greek myth with similar elements of the legend is the battle between Bellerophon and the Chimera. Budge makes explicit the parallel to pre-Christian myth,

I doubt much of the whole story of Saint George is anything more than one of the many versions of the old-world story of the conflict between Light and Darkness, or Ra and Apepi, and Marduk and Tiamat, woven upon a few slender threads of historical fact. Tiamat, the scaly, winged, foul dragon, and Apepi the powerful enemy of the glorious Sungod, were both destroyed and made to perish in the fire which he sent against them and their fiends: and Dadianus, also called the 'dragon', with his friends the sixty-nine governors, was also destroyed by fire called down from heaven by the prayer of Saint George.
In anticipation of the Saint George iconography, first noted in the 1870s, a Coptic stone fenestrella shows a mounted hawk-headed figure fighting a crocodile, interpreted by the Louvre as Horus killing a metamorphosed Setekh.

Christianised iconography
Depictions of "Christ militant" trampling a serpent is found in Christian art of the late 5th century. Iconography of the horseman with spear overcoming evil becomes current in the early medieval period.
Iconographic representations of St Theodore as dragon-slayer are dated to as early as the 7th century, certainly by the early 10th century (the oldest certain depiction of Theodore killing a dragon is at Aghtamar, dated c. 920).
Theodore is reported as having destroyed a dragon near Euchaita in a legend not younger than the late 9th century.
Early depictions of a horseman killing a dragon are unlikely to represent St. George, who in the 10th century was depicted as killing a human figure, not a dragon.

The earliest image of St Theodore as a horseman (named in Latin) is from Vinica, North Macedonia and, if genuine, dates to the 6th or 7th century. Here, Theodore is not slaying a dragon, but holding a draco standard.
One of the Vinica icons also has the oldest representation of Saint George with a dragon:
George stands besides a cynocephalous St. Christopher, both saints treading on snakes with human heads, and aiming at their heads with spears.
Maguire (1996) has connected the shift from unnamed equestrian heroes used in household magic to the more regulated iconography of named saints to the closer regulation of sacred imagery following the iconoclasm  of the 730s.

In the West,  a Carolingian-era depiction of a Roman horseman trampling and piercing a dragon between two soldier saints with lances and shields was put on the foot of a crux gemmata,  formerly in the Treasury of the Basilica of Saint Servatius in Maastricht (lost since the 18th c.). The representation survives in a 17th-century drawing, now in the Bibliothèque Nationale de France in Paris.

The "Christianisation" of the Thracian horseman iconography can be traced to the Cappadocian cave churches of Göreme, where frescoes of the 10th century show military saints on horseback confronting serpents with one, two or three heads. One of the earliest examples is from the church known as Mavrucan 3 , generally dated to the 10th century, which portrays two "sacred riders" confronting two serpents twined around a tree, in a striking parallel to the Dioskuroi stela, except that the riders are now attacking the snake in the "tree of life" instead of a boar.
In this example, at least, there appear to be two snakes with separate heads, but other examples of 10th-century Cappadocia show polycephalous snakes.

A similar example, but showing three equestrian saints, Demetrius, Theodore and George,
is from the "Zoodochos Pigi" chapel in central Macedonia in Greece, in the prefecture of Kilkis, near the modern village of Kolchida, dated to the 9th or 10th century.

A 12th-century depiction of the mounted dragon-slayer, presumably depicting Theodore, not George,
is found in four muqarna panels in the nave of the Cappella Palatina in Palermo.

Transfer to Saint George

The dragon motif was transferred to the George legend from that of his fellow soldier saint, Saint Theodore Tiro.

The transfer of the dragon iconography from Theodore, or Theodore and George as "Dioskuroi" to George on his own, first becomes tangible in the early 11th century.
The oldest certain images of St. George combatting the serpent are still found in Cappadocia.

Golden Legend
In the well-known version from Jacobus de Voragine's Legenda aurea (The Golden Legend, 1260s), the narrative episode of Saint George and the Dragon took place somewhere he called "Silene", in Libya.

Silene in Libya was plagued by a venom-spewing dragon dwelling in a nearby pond, poisoning the countryside. To prevent it from affecting the city itself, the people offered it two sheep daily, then a man and a sheep, and finally their children and youths, chosen by lottery. One time the lot fell on the king's daughter. The king offered all his gold and silver to have his daughter spared, but the people refused. The daughter was sent out to the lake, dressed as a bride, to be fed to the dragon.

Saint George by chance arrived at the spot. The princess tried to send him away, but he vowed to remain. The dragon emerged from the pond while they were conversing. Saint George made the Sign of the Cross and charged it on horseback, seriously wounding it with his lance. He then called to the princess to throw him her girdle, and he put it around the dragon's neck. When she did so, the dragon followed the girl like a "meek beast" on a leash.

The princess and Saint George led the dragon back to the city of Silene, where it terrified the populace. Saint George offered to kill the dragon if they consented to become Christians and be baptized. Fifteen thousand men including the king of Silene converted to Christianity. George then killed the dragon, beheading it with his sword, and the body was carted out of the city on four ox-carts. The king built a church to the Blessed Virgin Mary and Saint George on the site where the dragon died and a spring flowed from its altar with water that cured all disease.
Only the Latin version involves the saint striking the dragon with the spear, before killing it with the sword.

The Golden Legend narrative is the main source of the story of Saint George and the Dragon as received in Western Europe,
and is therefore relevant for Saint George as patron saint of England.
The princess remains unnamed in the Golden Legend version, and the name "Sabra" is supplied by Elizabethan era writer Richard Johnson in his Seven Champions of Christendom (1596). In the work, she is recast as a princess of Egypt. This work takes great liberties with the material, and makes St. George marry Sabra and have English children, one of whom becomes Guy of Warwick.
Alternative names given to the princess in Italian sources still of the 13th century are Cleolinda and Aia. Johnson also supplied the Saint George's sword name: "Ascalon".

Iconography

Medieval iconography

Eastern
The saint is depicted in the style of a Roman cavalryman in the tradition of the "Thracian Heros."
There are two main iconographic types, the "concise" form showing only George and the dragon,
and the "detailed" form also including the princess and the city walls or towers of Lacia (Lasia) with spectators witnessing the miracle.
The "concise" type originates in Cappadocia, in the 10th to 11th century (transferred from the same iconography associated with Saint Theodore of Tiro in the 9th to 10th century).
The earliest certain example of the "detailed" form may be a fresco from Pavnisi (dated c. 1160), although the examples from Adishi, Bochorma and Ikvi may be slightly earlier.

Georgian

Greek

Russian
The oldest example in Russia found on walls of the church of St George in Staraya Ladoga, dated c. 1167.
The saint is mostly shown on a white horse, facing right, but sometimes also on a black horse, or facing left.

The princess is usually not included. Another motif shows George on horseback with the youth of Mytilene sitting behind him.

Ethiopian

Western
The motif of Saint George as a knight on horseback slaying the dragon first appears in western art in the second half of the 13th century.
The tradition of the saint's arms being shown as the red-on-white St. George's Cross develops in the 14th century.

Renaissance
 Donatello, Saint George, c. 1417. Bargello, Florence, Italy.
 Paolo Uccello, Saint George and the Dragon, c. 1470. National Gallery, London.
 Giovanni Bellini, Saint George Fighting the Dragon, c. 1471. Pesaro altarpiece.
 Lieven van Lathem, Saint George and the Dragon (c. 1471)
 Bernt Notke, Saint George and the Dragon, Storkyrkan in Stockholm, ca. 1484–1489.
 Andrea della Robbia, terracotta, c. 1490
 Albrecht Dürer, woodcut, 1501/4
 Raphael (Raffaello Santi), St. George, 1504. Oil on wood. Louvre, Paris, France.
 Raphael (Raffaello Santi), St. George and the Dragon, 1504–1506. Oil on wood. National Gallery of Art, Washington, D.C., United States.
 Albrecht Altdorfer, Forest Landscape with St. George Fighting the Dragon, 1510
 Tintoretto (Jacopo Robusti), Saint George and the Dragon, 1555.

Early modern and modern art
Paintings
 Peter Paul Rubens, Saint George and the Dragon, 1620.
 Salvator Rosa, San Giorgio e il Drago
 Mattia Preti, St George triumphant over the dragon, 1678, at St. George's Basilica, Malta in Victoria, Gozo.
 Edward Burne-Jones, St. George and the Dragon, 1866.
 Gustave Moreau, St. George and the Dragon, c. 1870. Oil on canvas. The National Gallery, London.
 Briton Rivière, St. George and the Dragon, c. 1914.
 Uroš Predić, St George Killing the Dragon, 1930.
 Giorgio de Chirico, St. George Killing the Dragon, 1940.

Sculptures
 The sculptures which form part of the clock of Liberty's store in Regent Street, London (19th century).
 Sir Joseph Edgar Boehm, Saint George and the Dragon, bronze, State Library of Victoria, 1889
 Salvador Dalí, Saint George and the Dragon, Open Air Museum in Cosenza, 1947
 Edward Seago, Saint George and the Dragon, silver, automobile mascot used for the British monarch's cars, 1952.
 Zurab Tsereteli, St. George Statue, Tbilisi, 2005
 Marcus Canning and Christian de Vietri, Ascalon, abstract sculpture in front of St George's Cathedral, Perth, 2011

Mosaic
 Edward Poynter, Saint George for England, 1869. Central Lobby in the Palace of Westminster.
 Sergey Chekhonin, Sergey Vasilyevich Gerasimov, Central maiolica panel about the battle of St. George the Victorious with the Serpent 1911–1913, Moscow, Russia.
 Anatoly Alexandrovich Ostrogradsky, A small image of St. George, with the plot of the fresco of the Church of St. George in Staraya Ladoga in a stylized icon case on the façade, above the main porches, the maiolica was made in 1911–1913, Moscow, Russia.

Engravings
 Benedetto Pistrucci, engraving for coin dies, 1817.
 On kopecks issued by the Central Bank of Russia.

Prints
 On banknotes issued by the Bank of England:
 £1 note, 1917 until 1933, on obverse, with portrait of George V; 1928 until 1960, on reverse, duplicated.
 £5 note, 1957 until 1967, on obverse, with portrait of Britannia.
 £20 note, 1970 until 1993, on obverse, with portrait of Elizabeth II.

Literary adaptations
Edmund Spenser expands on the Saint George and the Dragon story in Book I of the Fairy Queen, initially referring to the hero as the Redcross Knight.
William Shakespeare refers to Saint George and the Dragon in Richard III ( Advance our standards, set upon our foes Our ancient world of courage fair St. George Inspire us with the spleen of fiery dragons act V, sc. 3), Henry V ( The game's afoot: follow your spirit, and upon this charge cry 'God for Harry, England, and Saint George! act III, sc. 1), and also in King Lear (act I).

A 17th-century broadside ballad paid homage to the feat of George's dragon slaying. Titled "St. George and the Dragon", the ballad considers the importance of Saint George in relation to other heroes of epic and Romance, ultimately concluding that all other heroes and figures of epic or romance pale in comparison to the feats of George.

The Banner of St George by Edward Elgar is a ballad for chorus and orchestra, words by Shapcott Wensley (1879).
The 1898 Dream Days by Kenneth Grahame includes a chapter entitled "The Reluctant Dragon", in which an elderly Saint George and a benign dragon stage a mock battle to satisfy the townsfolk and get the dragon introduced into society.  Later made into a film by Walt Disney Productions, and set to music by John Rutter as a children's operetta.

In 1935 Stanley Holloway recorded a humorous retelling of the tale as St. George and the Dragon written by Weston and Lee.
In the 1950s, Stan Freberg and Daws Butler wrote and performed St. George and the Dragon-Net (a spoof of the tale and of Dragnet) for Freberg's radio show. The story's recording became the first comedy album to sell over a million copies.

Margaret Hodges retold the legend in a 1984 children's book (Saint George and the Dragon) with Caldecott Medal-winning illustrations by Trina Schart Hyman.

Samantha Shannon describes her 2019 novel The Priory of the Orange Tree as a "feminist retelling" of Saint George and the Dragon.

Heraldry and vexillology
Coats of arms
Reggio Calabria used Saint George and the dragon in its coat of arms since at least 1757, derived from earlier (15th-century) iconography used on the city seal.
Saint George and the dragon has been depicted in the coat of arms of Moscow since the late 18th century,
and in the coat of arms of Georgia since 1991 (based on a coat of arms introduced in 1801 for Georgia within the Russian Empire).

Provincial coats of arms
 Kyiv Oblast, Ukraine (1999)
 Moscow Oblast, Russia (2005)

Municipal coats of arms
 Australia: Hurstville
 Austria: Pitten, Sankt Georgen an der Gusen, Sankt Georgen an der Leys, Sankt Georgen an der Stiefing, Sankt Georgen im Attergau, Sankt Georgen ob Murau.
 Croatia: Kaštel Sućurac.
 Czech Republic: Brušperk.
 Denmark: Holstebro.
 France: Aydoilles, Couilly-Pont-aux-Dames, Ligsdorf, Maulan, Mussidan, Saint-Georges (Moselle), Saint-Georges-Armont, Saint-Georges-d'Espéranche, Saint-Georges-d'Oléron, Saint-Georges-d'Orques, Saint-Georges-de-Reintembault, Saint-Georges-du-Bois, Saint-Georges-du-Vièvre, Saint-Georges-sur-Baulche, Saint-Georges-sur-Loire, Saint-Jurs, Saorge, Sospel, Villeneuve-Saint-Georges.
 Germany: Bürgel, Hattingen, Mansfeld, Rittersbach, St. Georgen im Schwarzwald, Schwarzenberg.
 Hungary: Bácsszentgyörgy, Balatonszentgyörgy, Borsodszentgyörgy, Dunaszentgyörgy, Homokszentgyörgy, Pécsvárad, Szentgyörgyvár, Szentgyörgyvölgy, Tatárszentgyörgy.
 Italy: Reggio Calabria
 Lithuania: Marijampolė, Prienai, Varniai.
 Netherlands: Ridderkerk, Terborg.
 Poland: Brzeg Dolny, Dzierżoniów, Milicz, Ostróda.
 Romania: Suceava, Sfântu Gheorghe.
 Russia: Moscow
 Serbia: Srpski Krstur.
 Slovakia: Svätý Jur.
 Slovenia: Šentjur
 Spain: Alcalá de los Gazules, Golosalvo, Puentedura.
 Switzerland: Castiel, Kaltbrunn, Ruschein, Saint-George, Schlans, Stein am Rhein, Waltensburg/Vuorz.
 Ukraine''': Holoby, Liuboml, Nizhyn, Taikury, Volodymyr, Vyshneve, Zbarazh.

Flags

Military insignia
 Regimental flags of the Hellenic Army (1864)
 Badge of the Royal Regiment of Fusiliers (1968)
 Flag of the Russian Orthodox Army (2014)

See also

 Bakasura
 Saint George
 Saint George in devotions, traditions and prayers
 Princess and dragon
 Ducasse de Mons
 Dragon Hill, Uffington

Explanatory notes

References
Citations

Sources
 
 
 

Bibliography

 
 
 Loomis, C. Grant, 1949. White Magic, An Introduction to the Folklore of Christian Legend (Cambridge: Medieval Society of America)
 
 Walter, C., "The Origins of the Cult of St. George," Revue des études byzantines, 53 (1995), 295–326.
 Whatley, E. Gordon, editor, with Anne B. Thompson and Robert K. Upchurch, 2004.  St. George and the Dragon in the South English Legendary (East Midland Revision, c. 1400) Originally published in Saints' Lives in Middle English Collections (on-line text: Introduction).

External links

 Saint George Legend explained in Javascript by Tomás Corral
 St George and the Dragon Events and Ideas – Official Website for Tourism in England
 St George Unofficial Bank Holiday: St. George and the Dragon'', free illustrated book based on 'The Seven Champions' by Richard Johnson (1596)
 St George's Bake and Brew 

 
Christian folklore
Medieval legends
Christian iconography
Saint George (martyr)
Tiamat